Waynesburg Central High School is a public high school serving around 500 students in grades 9-12 and is located near Waynesburg, the county seat of Greene County. WCHS is the sole high school of the Central Greene School District.

School Campus
Recently renovated and expanded, the campus was constructed in 1969 and features an auditorium, natatorium and an artificial turf Football field.

Alma Mater
The Alma Mater for WCHS:
Waynesburg, dear Waynesburg
Our teams won't yield
And sportsmen you’ll find them
In class, floor and field;
And our banner glorious
Our red and black
We’ll always honor
Nor courage we’ll lack
For Waynesburg, dear Waynesburg
Our cheer we’ll raise
And thee will we cherish
Through all our days
And even as old grads
We will come back,
To swell the chorus
For red and black.

Clubs
The following clubs are available at WCHS:
 Debate
 Drama
 Envirothon
 Fellowship of Christian Athletes
 Letterman's Club
 National Honor Society
 Oracle (Yearbook)
 PRIDE
 Relay for Life (Student Chapter)
 Ski Club
 The Raider Review
 WCHS Track and Field
 Future Business Leaders of America
 Spanish Club
 Creative Writing Club

Athletics
Waynesburg Central High School is a member of the Pennsylvania Interscholastic Athletic Association (PIAA) and the Western Pennsylvania Interscholastic Athletic League (WPIAL).  Waynesburg Central is in PIAA District 7.

Notable Graduates

Todd Tamanend Clark, poet and composer (1970) 
Sarah Rush, actress (1973)
Josh Koscheck, professional MMA fighter (1997)
Jesse Richardson, Draw the Lines PA 2018 winner (2019)
 Bill George: Linebacker Chicago Bears and LA Rams.  In the Pro Football hall of fame.

References

Public high schools in Pennsylvania
Educational institutions established in 1969
Schools in Greene County, Pennsylvania
1969 establishments in Pennsylvania